The South Wales Miners' Industrial Union, was a union set up in 1926 to counter the influence of the more radical South Wales Miners' Federation.  It was strong in pits such as Taff Merthyr, Trelewis, Treorchy and Bedwas.  From 1934 onwards the South Wales Miners' Federation launched a campaign against its existence and it was disbanded in 1938.

References

Mining trade unions
Mining in Wales
Defunct trade unions of the United Kingdom
1926 establishments in Wales
Trade unions established in 1926